J.C. Long (May 6, 1959) is an American former politician who was a Republican member of the Kansas House of Representatives from Harper, representing the 100th district from 1983–1991 and the 105th district from 1991–1993.

References

Republican Party members of the Kansas House of Representatives
Living people
20th-century American politicians
1959 births